is a Japanese politician of the New Komeito Party, a member of the House of Councillors in the Diet (national legislature). A native of Toyonaka, Osaka, he graduated from Kyoto University and received a master's degree in law from Osaka City University, he was elected for the first time in 1992.

References

External links 
 Official website in Japanese.

Members of the House of Councillors (Japan)
Kyoto University alumni
1947 births
Living people
People from Toyonaka, Osaka
New Komeito politicians